List of cool jazz and West Coast jazz musicians and vocalists.

A
 Curtis Amy  - Saxophone
 Earl Anderza - alto saxophone
 David Axelrod - composer

B
 Chet Baker
 Billy Bauer
 Milt Bernhart
 Lou Blackburn
 Dupree Bolton
 Bob Brookmeyer
 Clifford Brown
 Ray Brown
 Dave Brubeck
 Monty Budwig
 Larry Bunker
 Frank Butler

C
 Red Callender
 Conte Candoli
 Pete Candoli
 John Carisi
 Benny Carter
 Teddy Charles
 June Christy
 James Clay
 Al Cohn
 Buddy Collette
 Junior Collins
 Chris Connor
 Bob Cooper
 Curtis Counce
 Israel Crosby

D
 Miles Davis
 Michael Di Pasqua
 Paul Desmond
 Eric Dolphy

E
 Harry "Sweets" Edison
 Teddy Edwards
 Don Elliott
 Herb Ellis
 Bob Enevoldsen
 Bill Evans
 Gil Evans

F
 Don Fagerquist
 Tal Farlow
 Victor Feldman
 Maynard Ferguson
 Brent Fischer
 Clare Fischer
 Chuck Flores
 Carl Fontana
 Russ Freeman

G
 Herb Geller (woodwinds, composer, arranger)
 Stan Getz
 Jimmy Giuffre
 Bob Gordon
 Dexter Gordon
 John Graas
 Wardell Gray
 Vince Guaraldi
 Lars Gullin

H
 Jim Hall
 Charlie Haden
 Chico Hamilton
 Scott Hamilton
 Herbie Harper
 Hampton Hawes
 Percy Heath
 Woody Herman
 Billy Higgins
 Bill Holman
 Elmo Hope
 Paul Horn

J
 Milt Jackson
 Bobby Jaspar
 Pete Jolly
 Carmell Jones

K
 Fred Katz
 Richie Kamuca
 Connie Kay
 Barney Kessel
 Stan Kenton
 Lee Konitz
 Irene Kral
 Mark Kramer

L
 Harold Land
 John LaPorta
 Stan Levey
 Lou Levy
 John Lewis
 Mel Lewis

M
 Dave Mackay
 Joe Maini
 Herbie Mann
 Shelly Manne
 Larance Marable
 Charlie Mariano
 Warne Marsh
 Gary McFarland
 Gil Mellé
 Charles Mingus
 Red Mitchell
 Jack Montrose
 Joe Morello
 Frank Morgan
 Barbara Morrison
 Gerry Mulligan

N
 Lennie Niehaus

P
 Marty Paich
 Remo Palmier
 Dave Pell
 Art Pepper
 Bill Perkins
 Carl Perkins
 Roy Porter
 André Previn

R
  Jimmy Raney
 Max Roach
 Shorty Rogers
 Frank Rosolino
 Willie Ruff
 Howard Rumsey*****

S
 Bud Shank
 George Shearing
 Jack Sheldon
 Zoot Sims
 Johnny Smith
 Alvin Stoller

T
 Horace Tapscott
 Cal Tjader - vibraphone, drums, piano
 Cy Touff
 Lennie Tristano
 Bobby Troup

V 
 Leroy Vinnegar

W
 Julius Watkins
 Frank Wess
 Claude Williamson
 Stu Williamson
 Bill Watrous<ref name="carr"

Y
 Lester Young

Z
 Mike Zwerin

See also

References 

Cool
West Coast jazz